The Universities and Colleges Athletic Association (UCAA) is an athletic association of colleges and universities in the Philippines. It was established in August 20, 2002 and was headed by its president Art Onas. The season is usually held during the first semester of the school year, which regularly starts from August to October.

Member schools

Former members

UCAA Basketball Champions
 2002: St Francis Doves def. PSBA-QC Jaguars
 2003: St Francis Doves def. PSBA-QC Jaguars
 2004: EAC Generals def. PSBA-QC Jaguars
 2005: EAC Generals def. DLSU-D Patriots
 2006: EAC Generals def. St Francis Doves
 2007: St Francis Doves def. ACSAT Lightnings
 2008: UCN Dragons def. EAC Generals
 2009: UCN Dragons def. CSM Cougars
 2010: CSM Cougars def. TIP Engineers
 2011: PSBA-QC JAGUARS def. Olivarez College Sea Lions
 2012: Olivarez College Sea Lions def. DLSU-D Patriots
 2013: Rizal Techonogical University def. Olivarez College

References

Student sport in the Philippines
2002 establishments in the Philippines
Sports leagues established in 2002